Triflubazam is a drug which is a 1,5-benzodiazepine derivative, related to clobazam. It has sedative and anxiolytic effects, with a long half-life and duration of action.

See also
Benzodiazepine
Clobazam
CP-1414S
Triflunordazepam

References

Benzodiazepines
GABAA receptor positive allosteric modulators
Lactams
Trifluoromethyl compounds